Pierre Kovacs (born 22 June 1958) is a Swiss lightweight rower. He won a gold medal at the 1978 World Rowing Championships in Copenhagen with the lightweight men's four.

References

1958 births
Living people
Swiss male rowers
Swiss people of Hungarian descent
World Rowing Championships medalists for Switzerland